Paul Breisach (June 3, 1896 – December 26, 1952) was an Austrian-born conductor.  He was a pupil of Heinrich Schenker in Vienna from October 1913 for several years.  New Grove 2 reports that he was a conductor at the Deutsche Oper Berlin in the early 1930s until he emigrated. He conducted at the Metropolitan Opera from 1941 through 1946, and he was a staff conductor at the San Francisco Opera during the 1940s until his death.

1896 births
1952 deaths
Pupils of Heinrich Schenker
Emigrants from Austria after the Anschluss
20th-century conductors (music)
Musicians from Vienna
Austrian expatriates in Germany
Austrian emigrants to the United States